Haake is a surname. Notable people with the surname include:

August Haake (1889–1915), German landscape painter
Manfred Haake (born 1943), German rower
Mary Jane Haake (born 1951), American tattoo artist
Steve Haake, British professor of sports engineering
Tomas Haake (born 1971), Swedish musician